Nic Davis is an American documentary filmmaker. Davis produced and directed the 2021 documentary film Enormous: The Gorge Story.

Life and career 
Davis was raised in Bozeman, Montana. He graduated from Bozeman High School in 2006 and then attended college in Missoula where he graduated from The University of Montana with a degree in Broadcast Journalism. He currently lives between Los Angeles, CA and Bozeman.

During the early part of his career, Davis worked as a director, cinematographer, and editor for networks and clients including BBC, CNN, Bloomberg, Cadillac, Hulu, and Discovery. He was the director and cinematographer of the music video for JP Saxe's Sad Corny F*ck. In 2011, he launched his own production company, 4:08 Productions.

Davis’ most notable production is the film Enormous: The Gorge Story, a documentary about the Gorge Amphitheatre. Enormous: The Gorge Story was directed by Davis and released theatrically in July 2021. In 2022, Davis won an Emmy for this documentary. He produced and directed Landscapes of a Western Mind: The Story of Ivan Doig, a documentary about American author and novelist Ivan Doig. The film's trailer was released in 2021.

In 2016, Davis and 4:08 Productions developed a series of short films called The Montana Sessions that featured performances by musicians from Montana. The series was nominated for Emmy's in 2019, 2021 and 2022 and aired on PBS.

Davis most recently directed 21 Miles, a documentary film about the Pacific Coast Highway. The documentary highlights the dangers of the route and chronicles the accidents and deaths that have resulted on the highway.

References 

Living people
American documentary film directors
American documentary filmmakers
American documentary film producers
University of Montana alumni
Year of birth missing (living people)